Ervin Henry "Erv" Hall (born July 2, 1947) is a retired American sprinter who won a silver medal in the 110 m hurdles at the 1968 Olympics. In the semifinal he set an Olympic record at 13.3 seconds. He was 0.1 s slower in the final, and lost to Willie Davenport, who ran 13.3.

Hall ran collegitally for Villanova.    He was the 1969 NCAA Indoor Champion for 60 yard hurdles.

References

1947 births
Living people
Track and field athletes from Philadelphia
American male hurdlers
Olympic silver medalists for the United States in track and field
Athletes (track and field) at the 1968 Summer Olympics
Medalists at the 1968 Summer Olympics
Villanova University people